Twenty Twenty is a 2006 compilation album by T Bone Burnett, chronicling Burnett's entire career, including recordings by The Coward Brothers (Burnett's collaboration with Elvis Costello) and The Alpha Band.

Track listing

Disc 1
 "Humans from Earth" - 2:49
 "Born in Captivity" (The Alpha Band) - 4:06
 "Primitives" - 3:14
 "Power of Love" - 2:55
 "Fatally Beautiful" - 4:33
 "Monkey Dance" - 4:25
 "The Long Time Now" - 2:59
 "River of Love" - 3:34
 "Shut It Tight" - 2:56
 "Tear This Building Down" - 4:35
 "The Murder Weapon" - 5:14
 "Image" - 4:02
 "Kill Zone" - 4:05
 "Hula Hoop" - 3:25
 "Criminals" - 3:44
 "Diamonds Are a Girl's Best Friend" - 3:04
 "No Love at All" - 2:57
 "When the Night Falls" - 4:23
 "Over You" - 2:21
 "The Bird That I Held in My Hand" - 3:10

Disc 2
 "Every Little Thing" - 2:56
 "House of Mirrors" - 3:34
 "The Dogs" (The Alpha Band) - 4:21
 "Shake Yourself Loose" - 3:04
 "Kill Switch" - 2:56
 "I Wish You Could Have Seen Her Dance" - 3:48
 "Hefner and Disney" - 3:53
 "Drivin Wheel" - 3:13
 "Boomerang" - 4:19
 "Euromad" - 4:12
 "Strange Combination" - 3:50
 "East of East" (The Alpha Band) - 3:11
 "The People's Limousine" (The Coward Brothers) - 3:41
 "Trap Door" - 4:11
 "I'm Coming Home" - 4:02
 "It's Not Too Late" - 4:27
 "Song to a Dead Man" - 4:09
 "After All These Years" - 3:12
 "Man, Don't Dog Your Woman" - 3:44
 "Bon Temps Rouler" - 4:58

References

T Bone Burnett albums
Albums produced by T Bone Burnett
2006 compilation albums